Shelly Meg Peiken is an American songwriter who is best known for co-writing the US No. 1 hits "What a Girl Wants" and "Come On Over Baby" by Christina Aguilera the US No. 2 hit "Bitch" by Meredith Brooks, "Almost Doesn't Count" by Brandy, and "Who You Are" by Jessie J. She has also written for or with Britney Spears, The Pretenders, Natasha Bedingfield, Keith Urban, Rebecca realize, Celine Dion, Cher, Reba McEntire,  Jessie J, Miley Cyrus, Ed Sheeran, Aaliyah, Selena Gomez, Idina Menzel and Demi Lovato and has had hundreds of songs licensed for TV and film.

Biography

Shelly Peiken grew up in Freeport, Long Island where she became interested in music at an early age.

Later, she attended the University of Maryland where she studied fashion design only to come to New York City afterwards where she spent many years developing her true passion as a singer-songwriter.

She signed her first publishing deal with boutique company, Hit & Run Music, and went on to write songs for Brandy, Natalie Cole, Celine Dion, The Pretenders, Britney Spears, Jessie J, Demi Lovato, Selena Gomez, INXS, Backstreet Boys, Keith Urban and many others.

In 1998, Peiken and Meredith Brooks earned a Best Rock Song Grammy nomination for "Bitch".

Further success followed with two No. 1's for Christina Aguilera, "What a Girl Wants" and "Come On Over Baby,"  "I Wanna Be With You" for Mandy Moore, "Hook Me Up" (a No. 1 in Australia, written with Greg Wells and The Veronicas), "Who You Are" (written with Toby Gad and Jessie J), "Human on the Inside" for the Pretenders (written with Mark McEntee), and "Almost Doesn't Count" for Brandy (written with Guy Roche).

She has blogged for notable sites such as Huffington Post, and Yamaha Music where she writes of her experiences as a songwriter, creativity, the challenges of the current music business, and the balancing of career and parenthood. She has a personal website and blog as well.         
  
Peiken's first book, Confessions of a Serial Songwriter, was published by Backbeat Books, on March 1, 2016 and was nominated for Best Spoken Word Album at the 60th Annual Grammy Awards.

She resides in Los Angeles with husband, film composer Adam Gorgoni and her daughter, Layla.

Artist recordings
In 2020, Peiken began releasing singles from her debut album 2.0, etc…. Peiken called the album "a celebration of songwriting... I included songs from my career that either catapulted me in a commercial way but also songs I was very connected to and were never released commercially before. If I don't put them out there, nobody is ever going to hear them." The album includes previously unreleased songs "Just Wanna Be Your Girl," "George & John," and "Notebook," as well as her own recording of "What A Girl Wants" in celebration of its 20th anniversary as the first number 1 song of the century.

Discography

Complete discography

References

Year of birth missing (living people)
Living people
American women record producers
American women songwriters
21st-century American women